The Committee for the Re-election of the President (also known as the Committee to Re-elect the President), abbreviated CRP, but often mocked by the acronym CREEP, was, officially, a fundraising organization of United States President Richard Nixon's 1972 re-election campaign during the Watergate scandal. In addition to fundraising, the organization also engaged in political sabotage against Nixon's opponents, the various Democratic politicians running in the election.

History 
Planning began in late 1970 and an office opened in the spring of 1971. Besides its re-election activities, CRP employed money laundering and slush funds, and was involved in the Watergate scandal.

The CRP used $500,000 in funds raised to re-elect President Nixon to pay legal expenses for the five Watergate burglars. This act helped turn the burglary into an explosive political scandal. The burglars, as well as G. Gordon Liddy, E. Howard Hunt, John N. Mitchell, and other Nixon administration figures (Watergate Seven), were indicted over the break-in and their efforts to cover it up.

The acronym CREEP became popular due to the Watergate scandal.

Prominent members 
 Charles Colson, special counsel to the President
 Kenneth H. Dahlberg, Midwest finance chairman; developer of the Miracle-Ear hearing aid
 Francis L. Dale, chairman; publisher of The Cincinnati Enquirer; owner of the Cincinnati Reds
 E. Howard Hunt, consultant to the White House; retired CIA operative
 Herbert W. Kalmbach, deputy finance chairman; President Nixon's personal attorney
 Fred LaRue, deputy director; aide to John Mitchell
 G. Gordon Liddy, finance counsel; former aide to John Ehrlichman
 James W. McCord, Jr., security coordinator; former director of security at the Central Intelligence Agency
 Jeb Stuart Magruder, deputy director
 Fred Malek, manager; former Deputy Undersecretary of Health, Education, and Welfare
 Judy Hoback Miller, bookkeeper
 John N. Mitchell, director; former United States Attorney General
 Donald Segretti, political operative
 DeVan L. Shumway, spokesman
 Hugh W. Sloan, Jr., treasurer; former aide to White House Chief of Staff H.R. Haldeman
 Maurice Stans, finance chairman; former United States Secretary of Commerce
 Roger Stone, political operative

See also
 Young Voters for the President
 White House Plumbers

References

Committees
Watergate scandal
1972 United States presidential election
Fundraising